Ingars Sarmis Stuglis (born 12 February 1996) is a Latvian international footballer who plays for FK Ventspils, as a midfielder.

Career
Born in Aizkraukle, he has played club football for Skonto FC, FS METTA/Latvijas Universitāte and FK Spartaks Jūrmala.

He made his international debut for Latvia in 2018, coming on as a substitute against South Korea.

References

1996 births
Living people
Latvian footballers
Latvia international footballers
Skonto FC players
FS METTA/Latvijas Universitāte players
FK Spartaks Jūrmala players
FK Ventspils players
FK Liepāja players
Latvian Higher League players
Association football midfielders